Mylothris kilimensis is a butterfly in the family Pieridae. It is found in Kenya and  Tanzania. The habitat consists of submontane and montane forests.

The length of the forewings is 22–27 mm for males and 22.5-27.8 mm for females. There is a  large pale yellow basal area on the upperside of the forewings in both sexes. The hindwings with have a pale yellow basal area. The underside often has rays of greenish-yellow suffusion, particularly in females. The underside of the forewings has a basal pale yellow patch. Adults have a weak and floating flight. They fly around trees and shrubs.

The larvae feed on Santalales species.

Subspecies
Mylothris kilimensis kilimensis (southern Kenya, north-eastern Tanzania)
Mylothris kilimensis rondonis Kielland, 1990 (eastern Tanzania to the Rondo Plateau)

References

Butterflies described in 1990
Pierini